Kumrabaria Union is a union parishad situated at Jhenaidah Sadar Upazila,  in Jhenaidah District, Khulna Division of Bangladesh. There are 13 villages and 10 mouzas in the union.

References

External links
 

Unions of Khulna Division
Unions of Jhenaidah Sadar Upazila
Unions of Jhenaidah District